Luxembourg has a long tradition of beer brewing, dating back to at least 1300. Although there used to be more than 12 local breweries in Luxembourg in the early 1950s, this number has come down to only three big breweries remaining in the early 2010s. The three big breweries still active today are: Brasserie Nationale, producing Bofferding and Battin, Brasserie de Luxembourg (owned by Anheuser-Busch InBev), producing Diekirch and Mousel, and Brasserie Simon, producing Simon and Ourdaller (and Okult).

Although there has been a resurgence of several minor breweries in Luxembourg during the early 2000s (mostly local microbreweries producing craft beer), the largest brewery remains Brasserie Nationale whose brands Bofferding and Battin together make up for 58% of Luxembourg's beer consumption as of 2013. The main beer in Luxembourg is lager, drunk in over 95% of the cases.

History
The first beer brewery in Luxembourg was probably established around 1300 by monks in Neumünster Abbey, in the Grund district in Luxembourg City.

Economy

Breweries and brands

The 3 big breweries :
 Brasserie Nationale with its three brands Bofferding, Battin and Funck-Bricher
 Brasserie de Luxembourg with its two brands  Diekirch and Mousel
 Brasserie Simon with its brands Simon, Ourdaller and Okult
Microbreweries/Brewpubs:

 Letzebuerger Stad Brauerei with its brand Clausel
 Echternacher Brauerei from the city of Bech, offering great classical beers e.g. Helles
 Brewpub Béierhaascht brewing traditional beers.
 Den Héischter brewing lager
 Totenhopfen Brauhaus offering from classic to experimental beers (e.g. Svenson, Daily Nectar, Bloody Vlad)
 Fox Drinks offering low calorie beers
 Bare Brewing from the city of Differdange
 Grilo beer brewing classical beers
 Hinkelsbaacher Brauerei from the city of Fouhren

Defunct breweries and brands
 Brasserie de Dudelange (bought by Brasserie Funck-Bricher in 1964)
 Brasserie du Limpertsberg (founded in 1913 in the Limpertsberg district in Luxembourg City)
 Bierbrauerei zu Fels (from Larochette, defunct in 1866)
Grand Brewing Luxembourg offering beers like Amber Ale (i.e. Red Bridge) & IPAs (e.g. Satellite IPA). Meanwhile closed
Nowhere Brewing offering non-traditional beers like IPAs, Porters and Wheat Ales (e.g. Tropical Disease, Accidental Wheatness). Meanwhile disappeared
Brauerei Stuff with its beers Revolution I.P.A., Grande Ducale, Knights in white satin and Black Widow. Meanwhile closed
Bouneweger Brauerei from Bonnevoie. Meanwhile closed

References

External links

Bofferding
Battin
Diekirch & Mousel''
Simon
Ourdaller
Grand Brewing Luxembourg
Totenhopfen Brauhaus
Den Héischter
Béierhaascht
Nowhere Brewing
Stuff Brauerei
Fox Beer
Echternacher Brauerei
Bouneweger Brauerei
Hinkelsbaacher Brauerei